Víctor Sueiro (February 9, 1943 - December 13, 2007) was an Argentine journalist and writer.

1943 births
Argentine journalists
Male journalists
Argentine television personalities
2007 deaths
Burials at La Recoleta Cemetery
20th-century journalists